Raveen is a Sinhalese given name. Notable people with the name include:

 Raveen Sayer (born 1996), Sri Lankan cricketer
 Raveen Yasas (born 1999), Sri Lankan cricketer
 Tharuka Raveen (born 1997), Sri Lankan cricketer

See also
 Raveena

Sinhalese masculine given names